

Events

Pre-1600
30 BC – After the successful invasion of Egypt, Octavian executes Marcus Antonius Antyllus, the eldest son of Mark Antony, and Caesarion, the last king of the Ptolemaic dynasty of Egypt and only child of Julius Caesar and Cleopatra.
20 BC – Ludi Volcanalici are held within the temple precinct of Vulcan, and used by Augustus to mark the treaty with Parthia and the return of the legionary standards that had been lost at the Battle of Carrhae in 53 BC.
79 – Mount Vesuvius begins stirring, on the feast day of Vulcan, the Roman god of fire.
 476 – Odoacer, chieftain of the Germanic tribes (Herulic - Scirian foederati), is proclaimed rex Italiae ("King of Italy") by his troops.
1244 – Siege of Jerusalem: The city's citadel, the Tower of David, surrenders to the Khwarazmiyya.
1268 – The Battle of Tagliacozzo marks the fall of the Hohenstaufen family from the Imperial and Sicilian thrones, and leading to the new chapter of Angevin domination in Southern Italy.
1305 – Sir William Wallace is executed for high treason at Smithfield, London.
1328 – Battle of Cassel: French troops stop an uprising of Flemish farmers.
1382 – Siege of Moscow: The Golden Horde led by Tokhtamysh lays siege to the capital of the Grand Duchy of Moscow.
1514 – The Battle of Chaldiran ends with a decisive victory for the Sultan Selim I, Ottoman Empire, over the Shah Ismail I, founder of the Safavid dynasty.
1521 – Christian II of Denmark is deposed as king of Sweden and Gustav Vasa is elected regent.
1541 – French explorer Jacques Cartier lands near Quebec City in his third voyage to Canada.
1572 – French Wars of Religion: Mob violence against thousands of Huguenots in Paris results in the St. Bartholomew's Day massacre.
1595 – Long Turkish War: Wallachian prince Michael the Brave confronts the Ottoman army in the Battle of Călugăreni and achieves a tactical victory.
1600 – Battle of Gifu Castle: The eastern forces of Tokugawa Ieyasu defeat the western Japanese clans loyal to Toyotomi Hideyori, leading to the destruction of Gifu Castle and serving as a prelude to the Battle of Sekigahara.

1601–1900
1628 – George Villiers, the first Duke of Buckingham, is assassinated by John Felton.
1655 – Battle of Sobota: The Swedish Empire led by Charles X Gustav defeats the Polish–Lithuanian Commonwealth.
1703 – Edirne event: Sultan Mustafa II of the Ottoman Empire is dethroned.
1775 – American Revolutionary War: King George III delivers his Proclamation of Rebellion to the Court of St James's stating that the American colonies have proceeded to a state of open and avowed rebellion.
1782 – American Revolutionary War: British forces under Edward Despard complete the reconquest of the Black River settlements on the Mosquito Coast from the Spanish.
1784 – Western North Carolina (now eastern Tennessee) declares itself an independent state under the name of Franklin; it is not accepted into the United States, and only lasts for four years.
1799 – Napoleon I of France leaves Egypt for France en route to seizing power.
1813 – At the Battle of Großbeeren, the Prussians under Von Bülow repulse the French army.
1831 – Nat Turner's rebellion of enslaved Virginians is suppressed. 
1839 – The United Kingdom captures Hong Kong as a base as it prepares for the First Opium War with Qing China.
1864 – American Civil War: The Union Navy captures Fort Morgan, Alabama, thus breaking Confederate dominance of all ports on the Gulf of Mexico except Galveston, Texas.
1866 – The Austro-Prussian War ends with the Treaty of Prague.
1873 – The Albert Bridge in Chelsea, London opens.
1898 – The Southern Cross Expedition, the first British venture of the Heroic Age of Antarctic Exploration, departs from London.

1901–present
1904 – The automobile tire chain is patented.
1914 – World War I: The British Expeditionary Force and the French Fifth Army begin their Great Retreat before the German Army.
  1914   – World War I: Japan declares war on Germany.
1921 – British airship R-38 experiences structural failure over Hull in England and crashes in the Humber Estuary; of her 49 British and American training crew, only four survive.
1923 – Captain Lowell Smith and Lieutenant John P. Richter perform the first mid-air refueling on De Havilland DH-4B, setting an endurance flight record of 37 hours.
1927 – Italian anarchists Sacco and Vanzetti are executed after a lengthy, controversial trial.
1929 – Hebron Massacre during the 1929 Palestine riots: Arab attacks on the Jewish community in Hebron in the British Mandate of Palestine occur, continuing until the next day, resulting in the death of 65–68 Jews and the remaining Jews being forced to leave the city.
1939 – World War II: Nazi Germany and the Soviet Union sign the Molotov–Ribbentrop Pact. In a secret protocol to the pact, Poland, Finland, Estonia, Latvia, Lithuania, and Romania are divided into German and Soviet "spheres of influence".
1942 – World War II: Beginning of the Battle of Stalingrad.
1943 – World War II: Kharkiv is liberated by the Soviet Red Army for the second time after the Battle of Kursk.
1944 – World War II: Marseille is liberated by the Allied forces.
  1944   – World War II: King Michael of Romania dismisses the pro-Nazi government of Marshal Antonescu, who is later arrested. Romania switches sides from the Axis to the Allies.
  1944   – Freckleton air disaster: A United States Army Air Forces B-24 Liberator bomber crashes into a school in Freckleton, England, killing 61 people.
1945 – World War II: Soviet–Japanese War: The USSR State Defense Committee issues Decree no. 9898cc "About Receiving, Accommodation, and Labor Utilization of the Japanese Army Prisoners of War".
1946 – Ordinance No. 46 of the British Military Government constitutes the German Länder (states) of Hanover and Schleswig-Holstein.
1948 – The World Council of Churches is formed by 147 churches from 44 countries.
1954 – The first flight of the Lockheed C-130 multi-role aircraft takes place.
1958 – Chinese Civil War: The Second Taiwan Strait Crisis begins with the People's Liberation Army's bombardment of Quemoy.
1966 – Lunar Orbiter 1 takes the first photograph of Earth from orbit around the Moon.
1970 – Organized by Mexican American labor union leader César Chávez, the Salad Bowl strike, the largest farm worker strike in U.S. history, begins.
1973 – A bank robbery gone wrong in Stockholm, Sweden, turns into a hostage crisis; over the next five days the hostages begin to sympathise with their captors, leading to the term "Stockholm syndrome".
1975 – The start of the Wave Hill walk-off by Gurindji people in Australia, lasting eight years, a landmark event in the history of Indigenous land rights in Australia, commemorated in a 1991 Paul Kelly song and an annual celebration.
1985 – Hans Tiedge, top counter-spy of West Germany, defects to East Germany.
1989 – Singing Revolution: Two million people from Estonia, Latvia and Lithuania stand on the Vilnius–Tallinn road, holding hands. 
1990 – Saddam Hussein appears on Iraqi state television with a number of Western "guests" (actually hostages) to try to prevent the Gulf War.
  1990   – Armenia declares its independence from the Soviet Union.
  1990   – West and East Germany announce that they will reunite on October 3.
1991 – The World Wide Web is opened to the public.
1994 – Eugene Bullard, the only African American pilot in World War I, is posthumously commissioned as Second Lieutenant in the United States Air Force.
2000 – Gulf Air Flight 072 crashes into the Persian Gulf near Manama, Bahrain, killing 143.
2006 – Natascha Kampusch, who had been abducted at the age of ten, escapes from her captor Wolfgang Přiklopil, after eight years of captivity.
2007 – The skeletal remains of Russia's last royal family members Alexei Nikolaevich, Tsarevich of Russia, and his sister Grand Duchess Anastasia are discovered near Yekaterinburg, Russia.
2010 – The Manila hostage crisis occurred near the Quirino Grandstand in Manila, Philippines killing 9 people including the perpetrator while injuring 9 others.
2011 – A magnitude 5.8 (class: moderate) earthquake occurs in Virginia. Damage occurs to monuments and structures in Washington, D.C. and the resulted damage is estimated at 200 million–300 million USD.
  2011   – Libyan leader Muammar Gaddafi is overthrown after the National Transitional Council forces take control of Bab al-Azizia compound during the Libyan Civil War.
2012 – A hot-air balloon crashes near the Slovenian capital of Ljubljana, killing six people and injuring 28 others.
2013 – A riot at the Palmasola prison complex in Santa Cruz, Bolivia kills 31 people.

Births

Pre-1600
1482 – Jo Gwang-jo, Korean philosopher (d. 1520)
1486 – Sigismund von Herberstein, Slovenian historian and diplomat (d. 1566)
1498 – Miguel da Paz, Prince of Portugal (d. 1500)
1524 – François Hotman, French lawyer and jurist (d. 1590)
1579 – Thomas Dempster, Scottish scholar and historian (d. 1625)

1601–1900
1623 – Stanisław Lubieniecki, Polish astronomer, theologian, and historian (d. 1675)
1724 – Abraham Yates, Jr., American lawyer and civil servant (d. 1796)
1741 – Jean-François de Galaup, comte de Lapérouse, French admiral and explorer (d. 1788)
1754 – Louis XVI of France (d. 1793)
1769 – Georges Cuvier, French biologist and academic (d. 1832)
1783 – William Tierney Clark, English engineer, designed the Hammersmith Bridge (d. 1852)
1785 – Oliver Hazard Perry, American commander (d. 1819)
1805 – Anton von Schmerling, Austrian judge and politician (d. 1893)
1814 – James Roosevelt Bayley, American archbishop (d. 1877)
1829 – Moritz Cantor, German mathematician and historian (d. 1920)
1843 – William Southam, Canadian publisher (d. 1932)
1846 – Alexander Milne Calder, Scottish-American sculptor (d. 1923)
1847 – Sarah Frances Whiting, American physicist and astronomer (d. 1927)
1849 – William Ernest Henley, English poet and critic (d. 1903)
1850 – John Cockburn, Scottish-Australian politician, 18th Premier of South Australia (d. 1929)
1852 – Radha Gobinda Kar, Indian physician and philanthropist (d. 1918)
  1852   – Clímaco Calderón, Colombian lawyer and politician, 15th President of Colombia (d. 1913)
  1852   – Arnold Toynbee, English economist and historian (d. 1883)
1854 – Moritz Moszkowski, Polish-German pianist and composer (d. 1925)
1864 – Eleftherios Venizelos, Greek lawyer, jurist, and politician, 93rd Prime Minister of Greece (d. 1936)
1867 – Edgar de Wahl, Ukrainian-Estonian linguist and academic (d. 1948)
1868 – Edgar Lee Masters, American lawyer, author, poet, and playwright (d. 1950)
1872 – Tanguturi Prakasam, Indian lawyer and politician, 1st Chief Minister of Andhra (d. 1957)
1875 – William Eccles, English physicist and engineer (d. 1966)
  1875   – Eugene Lanceray, Russian painter and sculptor (d. 1946)
1877 – István Medgyaszay, Hungarian architect and academic (d. 1959)
1880 – Alexander Grin, Russian sailor and author (d. 1932)
1882 – Volin, Russia anarchist intellectual (d. 1945)
1883 – Jonathan M. Wainwright, American general, Medal of Honor recipient (d. 1953)
1884 – Will Cuppy, American author and critic (d. 1949)
  1884   – Ogden L. Mills, American captain, lawyer, and politician, 50th United States Secretary of the Treasury (d. 1937)
1890 – Harry Frank Guggenheim, American businessman and publisher, co-founded Newsday (d. 1971)
1891 – Roy Agnew, Australian pianist and composer (d. 1944)
  1891   – Minna Craucher, Finnish socialite and spy (d. 1932)
1894 – John Auden, English solicitor, deputy coroner and a territorial soldier (d. 1959)
1897 – Henry F. Pringle, American historian and journalist (d. 1958)
1900 – Frances Adaskin, Canadian pianist (d. 2001)
  1900   – Ernst Krenek, Austrian-American composer and educator (d. 1991)
  1900   – Malvina Reynolds, American singer-songwriter and activist (d. 1978)

1901–present
1901 – Guy Bush, American baseball player and manager (d. 1985)
  1901   – John Sherman Cooper, American captain, lawyer, and politician, 2nd United States Ambassador to East Germany (d. 1991)
1904 – William Primrose, Scottish viola player and educator (d. 1982)
1905 – Ernie Bushmiller, American cartoonist (d. 1982)
  1905   – Constant Lambert, English composer and conductor (d. 1951)
1906 – Zoltan Sarosy, Hungarian-Canadian chess master (d. 2017)
1908 – Hannah Frank, Scottish sculptor and illustrator (d. 2008)
1909 – Syd Buller, English cricketer and umpire (d. 1970)
1910 – Lonny Frey, American baseball player and soldier (d. 2009)
  1910   – Giuseppe Meazza, Italian footballer and manager (d. 1979)
1911 – Betty Robinson, American sprinter (d. 1999)
1912 – Gene Kelly, American actor, singer, and dancer (d. 1996)
  1912   – Igor Troubetzkoy, Russian aristocrat and race car driver (d. 2008)
1913 – Bob Crosby, American swing singer and bandleader (d. 1993)
1917 – Tex Williams, American singer-songwriter and guitarist (d. 1985)
1919 – Vladimir Abramovich Rokhlin, Azerbaijani mathematician and theorist (d. 1984)
1921 – Kenneth Arrow, American economist and academic, Nobel Prize laureate (d. 2017)
  1921   – Sam Cook, English cricketer and umpire (d. 1996)
1922 – Nazik Al-Malaika, Iraqi poet and academic (d. 2007)
  1922   – Jean Darling, American actress and singer (d. 2015)
  1922   – George Kell, American baseball player and sportscaster (d. 2009)
1924 – Ephraim Kishon, Israeli author, screenwriter, and director (d. 2005)
  1924   – Robert Solow, American economist and academic, Nobel Prize laureate
1925 – Robert Mulligan, American director and producer (d. 2008)
1926 – Clifford Geertz, American anthropologist and academic (d. 2006)
  1926   – Gyula Hernádi, Hungarian author and screenwriter (d. 2005)
1927 – Dick Bruna, Dutch author and illustrator (d. 2017)
  1927   – Allan Kaprow, American painter and author (d. 2006)
  1927   – Martial Solal, Algerian-French pianist and composer
1928 – Marian Seldes, American actress (d. 2014)
1929 – Vladimir Beekman, Estonian poet and translator (d. 2009)
  1929   – Zoltán Czibor, Hungarian footballer (d. 1997)
  1929   – Vera Miles, American actress
  1929   – Peter Thomson, Australian golfer (d. 2018)
1930 – Michel Rocard, French civil servant and politician, 160th Prime Minister of France (d. 2016)
1931 – Barbara Eden, American actress and singer
  1931   – Hamilton O. Smith, American microbiologist and academic, Nobel Prize laureate
1932 – Houari Boumediene, Algerian colonel and politician, 2nd President of Algeria (d. 1978)
  1932   – Enos Nkala, Zimbabwean soldier and politician, Zimbabwean Minister of Defence (d. 2013)
  1932   – Mark Russell, American comedian and pianist
1933 – Robert Curl, American chemist, Nobel Prize laureate (d. 2022)
  1933   – Don Talbot, Australian swim coach and administrator (d. 2020)
  1933   – Pete Wilson, American commander and politician, 36th Governor of California
1934 – Sonny Jurgensen, American football player and sportscaster
1935 – Roy Strong, English historian, curator, and author
1936 – Rudy Lewis, American R&B singer (d. 1964)
  1936   – Henry Lee Lucas, American murderer (d. 2001)
1938 – Giacomo Bini, Italian priest and missionary (d. 2014)
  1938   – Roger Greenaway, English singer-songwriter and producer
1940 – Galen Rowell, American mountaineer and photographer (d. 2002)
  1940   – Richard Sanders, American actor and screenwriter
1941 – Onora O'Neill, Baroness O'Neill of Bengarve, British philosopher, academic, and politician
1942 – Nancy Richey, American tennis player
1943 – Dale Campbell-Savours, Baron Campbell-Savours, English businessman and politician
  1943   – Nelson DeMille, American lieutenant and author
  1943   – Peter Lilley, English politician, Secretary of State for Business, Innovation and Skills
  1943   – Pino Presti, Italian bass player, composer, conductor, and producer
1944 – Antonia Novello, Puerto Rican-American physician and admiral, 14th Surgeon General of the United States
1945 – Rayfield Wright, American football player and coach
1946 – Keith Moon, English drummer, songwriter, and producer (d. 1978)
1947 – Willy Russell, English playwright and composer
  1947   – Linda Thompson, English folk-rock singer-songwriter
1948 – Atef Bseiso, Palestinian intelligence officer (d. 1992)
  1948   – Andrei Pleșu, Romanian journalist and politician, 95th Romanian Minister of Foreign Affairs
  1948   – Rudy Ruettiger, American football player
  1948   – Lev Zeleny, Russian physicist and academic
1949 – Vicky Leandros, Greek singer and politician
  1949   – Shelley Long, American actress
  1949   – Rick Springfield, Australian-American singer-songwriter, guitarist, and actor
1950 – Luigi Delneri, Italian footballer and manager
1951 – Jimi Jamison, American singer-songwriter and musician (d. 2014)
  1951   – Akhmad Kadyrov, Chechen cleric and politician, 1st President of the Chechen Republic (d. 2004)
  1951   – Queen Noor of Jordan
1952 – Santillana, Spanish footballer
  1952   – Georgios Paraschos, Greek footballer and manager
1953 – Bobby G, English singer-songwriter
1954 – Charles Busch, American actor and screenwriter
  1954   – Halimah Yacob, Singaporean unionist and politician, 9th Speaker and 8th President of Singapore
1955 – David Learner, British actor
1956 – Andreas Floer, German mathematician and academic (d. 1991)
  1956   – Valgerd Svarstad Haugland, Norwegian educator and politician, Norwegian Minister of Culture
1957 – Tasos Mitropoulos, Greek footballer and politician
1958 – Julio Franco, Dominican baseball player and manager
1959 – Edwyn Collins, Scottish singer-songwriter and guitarist
  1959   – George Kalovelonis, Greek tennis player and coach
1960 – Gary Hoey, American guitarist, songwriter, and producer
1961 – Dean DeLeo, American guitarist and songwriter
  1961   – Alexandre Desplat, French composer and conductor
  1961   – Mohammad Bagher Ghalibaf, Iranian commander and politician, 54th Mayor of Tehran
  1961   – Gary Mabbutt, English footballer
  1961   – Hitomi Takahashi, Japanese actress
1962 – Martin Cauchon, Canadian lawyer and politician, 46th Canadian Minister of Justice
  1962   – Shaun Ryder, English singer-songwriter and actor
1963 – Park Chan-wook, South Korean director, producer, and screenwriter
  1963   – Glória Pires, Brazilian actress
  1963   – Richard Illingworth, English cricketer and umpire
  1963   – Kenny Wallace, American race car driver
1964 – Kong Hee, Founder and former senior pastor of City Harvest Church
1965 – Roger Avary, Canadian director, producer, and screenwriter
1966 – Rik Smits, Dutch-American basketball player
1967 – Jim Murphy, Scottish lawyer and politician, Minister of State for Europe
  1967   – Richard Petrie, New Zealand cricketer
1968 – Laura Claycomb, American soprano
  1968   – Chris DiMarco, American golfer
1969 – Tinus Linee, South African rugby player and coach (d. 2014)
  1969   – Jack Lopresti, English soldier and politician
  1969   – Jeremy Schaap, American journalist and author
  1969   – Keith Tyson, English painter and illustrator
1970 – Lawrence Frank, American basketball player and coach
  1970   – Jason Hetherington, Australian rugby league player
  1970   – Jay Mohr, American actor, producer, and screenwriter
  1970   – River Phoenix, American actor (d. 1993)
1971 – Demetrio Albertini, Italian footballer and manager
  1971   – Tim Gutberlet, German footballer
  1971   – Gretchen Whitmer, 49th Governor of Michigan
1972 – Mark Butcher, English cricketer and singer
  1972   – Raul Casanova, Puerto Rican-American baseball player
  1972   – Anthony Calvillo, Canadian football player
  1972   – Martin Grainger, English footballer and manager
  1972   – Manuel Vidrio, Mexican footballer, coach, and manager
1973 – Casey Blake, American baseball player
  1973   – Kerry Walmsley, New Zealand cricketer
1974 – Lexi Alexander, American film and television director
  1974   – Mark Bellhorn, American baseball player
  1974   – Benjamin Limo, Kenyan runner
  1974   – Konstantin Novoselov, Russian-English physicist and academic, Nobel Prize laureate
  1974   – Ray Park, Scottish actor and stuntman
1975 – Sean Marks, New Zealand basketball player and manager
  1975   – Eliza Carthy, English folk musician
1976 – Pat Garrity, American basketball player
1977 – Douglas Sequeira, Costa Rican footballer and manager
  1977   – Jared Fogle, former spokesperson for chain restaurant Subway
1978 – Kobe Bryant, American basketball player and businessman (d. 2020)
  1978   – Julian Casablancas, American singer-songwriter and producer
  1978   – Randal Tye Thomas, American journalist and politician (d. 2014)
  1978   – Andrew Rannells, American actor and singer
1979 – Jessica Bibby, Australian basketball player
  1979   – Saskia Clark, English sailor
  1979   – Edgar Sosa, Mexican boxer
  1979   – Zuzana Váleková, Slovak tennis player
1980 – Denny Bautista, Dominican baseball player
  1980   – Nadine Jolie Courtney, American journalist, reality personality and author
  1980   – Rex Grossman, American football player
  1980   – Nenad Vučković, Serbian handball player
1981 – Carlos Cuéllar, Spanish footballer
  1981   – Stephan Loboué, Ivorian footballer
1982 – Natalie Coughlin, American swimmer
  1982   – Scott Palguta, American soccer player
  1982   – Cristian Tudor, Romanian footballer (d. 2012)
1983 – James Collins, Welsh footballer
  1983   – Athena Farrokhzad, Iranian-Swedish poet, playwright, and critic
  1983   – Sun Mingming, Chinese basketball player
  1983   – Tony Moll, American football player
  1983   – Fiona Onasanya, British Labour Party politician and criminal
  1983   – Bruno Spengler, Canadian race car driver
1984 – Glen Johnson, English footballer
  1984   – Eric Tai, New Zealand rugby player and actor
1985 – Valeria Lukyanova, Moldovan-Ukrainian model and singer
1986 – Neil Cicierega, American comedian and musician
  1986   – Ayron Jones, American musician
  1986   – Brett Morris, Australian rugby league player
  1986   – Josh Morris, Australian rugby league player
1988 – Olga Govortsova, Belarusian tennis player
  1988   – Carl Hagelin, Swedish ice hockey player
  1988   – Jeremy Lin, American basketball player
1989 – Lianne La Havas, British singer, songwriter, and multi-instrumentalist
  1989   – Trixie Mattel, American drag queen, actor, and country singer
  1989   – Heiko Schwarz, German footballer
  1989   – TeddyLoid, Japanese musician
1990 – Seth Curry, American basketball player
  1990   – Mike Yastrzemski, American baseball player 
1992 – Nicola Docherty, Scottish footballer
1993 – Iván López, Spanish professional footballer
1994 – August Ames, Canadian pornographic actress (d. 2017)
1995 – Gabriela Lee, Romanian tennis player
1995     – Cameron Norrie, British tennis player
1997 – Lil Yachty, American rapper and singer

Deaths

Pre-1600
30 BC – Caesarion, Egyptian king (b. 47 BC)
  30 BC   – Marcus Antonius Antyllus, Roman soldier (b. 47 BC)
93 – Gnaeus Julius Agricola, Roman general and politician (b. AD 40)
 406 – Radagaisus, Gothic king
 634 – Abu Bakr, Arabian caliph (b. 573)
 992 – Volkold, bishop of Meissen
1106 – Magnus, Duke of Saxony (b. 1045)
1176 – Emperor Rokujō of Japan (b. 1164)
1305 – William Wallace, Scottish rebel commander (b. 1272)
1328 – Nicolaas Zannekin, Flemish peasant leader (in the battle of Cassel)
1329 – Frederick IV, Duke of Lorraine (b. 1282)
1335 – Heilwige Bloemardinne, Christian mystic (b. c. 1265)
1348 – John de Stratford, Archbishop of Canterbury
1363 – Chen Youliang, founder of the Dahan regime (b. 1320)
1367 – Gil Álvarez Carrillo de Albornoz, Spanish cardinal (b. 1310)
1478 – Johannes Pullois, Franco-Flemish composer (b. c. 1420?)
1481 – Thomas de Littleton, English judge and legal author (b. c. 1407)
1498 – Isabella of Aragon, Queen of Portugal, eldest daughter of Isabella I of Castile and Ferdinand II of Aragon (b. 1470)
1507 – Jean Molinet, French poet and composer (b. 1435)
1519 – Philibert Berthelier, Swiss soldier (b. 1465)
1540 – Guillaume Budé, French philosopher and scholar (b. 1467)
1568 – Thomas Wharton, 1st Baron Wharton (b. 1495)
1574 – Ebussuud Efendi, Turkish lawyer and jurist (b. 1490)
1591 – Luis de León, Spanish poet and academic (b. 1527)

1601–1900
1618 – Gerbrand Adriaenszoon Bredero, Dutch poet and playwright (b. 1585)
1628 – George Villiers, 1st Duke of Buckingham, English politician, Lord Lieutenant of Buckinghamshire (b. 1592)
1652 – John Byron, 1st Baron Byron, English soldier and politician (b. 1600)
1706 – Edward Nott, English politician, Colonial Governor of Virginia (b. 1654)
1723 – Increase Mather, American minister and author (b. 1639)
1806 – Charles-Augustin de Coulomb, French physicist and engineer (b. 1736)
1813 – Alexander Wilson (ornithologist), Scottish-American poet, ornithologist, and illustrator (b. 1766)
1819 – Oliver Hazard Perry, American commander (b. 1785)
1831 – Ferenc Kazinczy, Hungarian author and poet (b. 1759)
  1831   – August Neidhardt von Gneisenau, Prussian field marshal (b. 1760)
1853 – Alexander Calder, American lawyer and politician (b. 1806)
1867 – Auguste-Marseille Barthélemy, French poet and author (b. 1796)
1880 – William Thompson, British boxer (b. 1811)
1892 – Deodoro da Fonseca, Brazilian field marshal and politician, 1st President of Brazil (b. 1827)
1900 – Kuroda Kiyotaka, Japanese general and politician, 2nd Prime Minister of Japan (b. 1840)

1901–present
1924 – Heinrich Berté, Slovak-Austrian composer (b. 1856)
1926 – Rudolph Valentino, Italian actor (b. 1895)
1927 – Nicola Sacco, Italian anarchist convicted of murder (b. 1891)
  1927   – Bartolomeo Vanzetti, Italian anarchist convicted of murder (b. 1888)
1933 – Adolf Loos, Austrian architect and theoretician, designed Villa Müller (b. 1870)
1937 – Albert Roussel, French composer and educator (b. 1869)
1944 – Abdülmecid II, Ottoman sultan (b. 1868)
  1944   – Stefan Filipkiewicz, Polish painter and illustrator (b. 1879)
1949 – Helen Churchill Candee, American geographer, journalist, and author (b. 1858)
1954 – Jaan Sarv, Estonian mathematician and scholar (b. 1877)
1960 – Oscar Hammerstein II, American director, producer, and composer (b. 1895)
1962 – Walter Anderson, Russian-German ethnologist and academic (b. 1885)
  1962   – Hoot Gibson, American actor, director, and producer (b. 1892)
1964 – Edmond Hogan, Australian politician, 30th Premier of Victoria (b. 1883)
1966 – Francis X. Bushman, American actor, director, and screenwriter (b. 1883)
1967 – Georges Berger, Belgian race car driver (b. 1918)
  1967   – Nathaniel Cartmell, American runner and coach (b. 1883)
1974 – Roberto Assagioli, Italian psychiatrist and author (b. 1888)
1975 – Faruk Gürler, Turkish general (b. 1913)
1977 – Naum Gabo, Russian sculptor and academic (b. 1890)
1982 – Stanford Moore, American biochemist and academic, Nobel Prize laureate (b. 1913)
1987 – Didier Pironi, French race car and boat driver (b. 1952)
1989 – Mohammed Abed Elhai, Sudanese poet and academic (b. 1944)
  1989   – R. D. Laing, Scottish psychiatrist and author (b. 1927)
1990 – David Rose, American pianist and composer (b. 1910)
1994 – Zoltán Fábri, Hungarian director and screenwriter (b. 1917)
1995 – Alfred Eisenstaedt, German-American photographer and journalist (b. 1898)
1996 – Margaret Tucker, Australian author and activist (b. 1904)
1997 – Eric Gairy, Grenadian educator and politician, 1st Prime Minister of Grenada (b. 1922)
  1997   – John Kendrew, English biochemist and crystallographer, Nobel Prize laureate (b. 1917)
1999 – Norman Wexler, American screenwriter (b. 1926)
2000 – John Anthony Kaiser, American priest and missionary (b. 1932)
2001 – Kathleen Freeman, American actress (b. 1919)
  2001   – Peter Maas, American journalist and author (b. 1929)
2002 – Hoyt Wilhelm, American baseball player and coach (b. 1922)
2003 – Bobby Bonds, American baseball player and manager (b. 1946)
  2003   – Jack Dyer, Australian footballer and coach (b. 1913)
  2003   – Jan Sedivka, Czech-Australian violinist and educator (b. 1917)
  2003   – Michael Kijana Wamalwa, Kenyan lawyer and politician, 8th Vice President of Kenya (b. 1944)
2005 – Brock Peters, American actor (b. 1927)
2006 – Maynard Ferguson, Canadian trumpet player and bandleader (b. 1928)
2008 – John Russell, English-American author and critic (b. 1919)
2012 – Jerry Nelson, American puppeteer and voice actor (b. 1934)
  2012   – Josepha Sherman, American anthologist and author (b. 1946)
2013 – Richard J. Corman, American businessman, founded the R.J. Corman Railroad Group (b. 1955)
  2013   – William Glasser, American psychiatrist and author (b. 1925)
  2013   – Charles Lisanby, American production designer and set director (b. 1924)
  2013   – Konstanty Miodowicz, Polish ethnographer and politician (b. 1951)
  2013   – Vesna Rožič, Slovenian chess player (b. 1987)
  2013   – Tatyana Zaslavskaya, Russian sociologist and economist (b. 1927)
2014 – Albert Ebossé Bodjongo, Cameroonian footballer (b. 1989)
  2014   – Annefleur Kalvenhaar, Dutch cyclist (b. 1994)
  2014   – Birgitta Stenberg, Swedish author and illustrator (b. 1932)
  2014   – Jaume Vallcorba Plana, Spanish philologist and publisher (b. 1949)
2015 – Augusta Chiwy, Congolese-Belgian nurse (b. 1921)
  2015   – Guy Ligier, French rugby player and race car driver (b. 1930)
  2015   – Enrique Reneau, Honduran footballer (b. 1971)
  2015   – Paul Royle, Australian lieutenant and pilot (b. 1914)
2021 – Elizabeth Blackadder, Scottish painter and printmaker (b. 1931)

Holidays and observances
Battle of Kursk Day (Russia)
 Christian feast day:
Ascelina
Asterius, Claudius, and Neon
Éogan of Ardstraw
Lupus (Luppus) of Novae
Philip Benitius
Quiriacus and companions, of Ostia
Rose of Lima
Tydfil
Zacchaeus of Jerusalem
August 23 (Eastern Orthodox liturgics)
Day of the National Flag (Ukraine)
European Day of Remembrance for Victims of Stalinism and Nazism or Black Ribbon Day (European Union and other countries), and related observances:
Liberation from Fascist Occupation Day (Romania)
International Day for the Remembrance of the Slave Trade and its Abolition
National Day for Physicians (Iran)
Umhlanga Day (Eswatini)

References

External links

 
 
 

Days of the year
August